Statistics of American Soccer League II in season 1948–49.

League standings

Championship playoff series
Since three teams finished the season with the same point totals, a two-match, championship playoff was held. Brooklyn Hispano hosted New York Americans in the first match. The winner of that play-in contest earned the right to face Philadelphia Nationals two weeks later. In the event that either of these matches ended in a draw the following procedures were to be used. Two 15-minute overtime periods to be played in their entirety. If the match was still tied after 120 minutes, the teams would then play two 7.5-minute periods. If still tied after 135 minutes, successive 7.5 minute periods would be played until one team either scored a golden goal or earned a corner kick.

Bracket

Match one – Play-in game

Match two – Championship final
The championship final played out as 90 minutes of regulation and 45 minutes of extra time, before moving to the first  period of sudden death (via goal or corner kick). Jim Mills earned a corner kick for Philadelphia to end the match.

References

American Soccer League (1933–1983) seasons
Amer